Malasar (Malayar) is an unclassified Southern Dravidian language spoken by a Scheduled tribe of India. It is close to Eravallan.

References

Dravidian languages